Liolaemus lemniscatus (wreath tree iguana or elegant tree iguana) is a species of lizard in the family Iguanidae.
It is found in Argentina and Chile.

References

The Reptile Database: Liolaemus chiliensis

lemniscatus
Lizards of South America
Reptiles of Argentina
Reptiles of Chile
Taxa named by Johann Ludwig Christian Gravenhorst
Reptiles described in 1837
Taxonomy articles created by Polbot